A list of films produced by the Israeli film industry in 1990.

1990 releases

Unknown premiere date

Awards

See also
1990 in Israel

References

External links
 Israeli films of 1990 at the Internet Movie Database

Israeli
Film
1990